The Simpson planetary gearset is a compound planetary gear train consisting of two planetary gearsets sharing a common sun gear. A Simpson gearset delivers three forward gears and one reverse, plus neutral, and is commonly employed in three and four ratio automatic transmissions. It is one of the several designs invented by American engineer Howard Simpson.

Overview
 
The two planetaries are interdependent via two permanent connections, that commonly but not necessarily have the same gears and gear ratios, both gearsets share a common sun gear. The planet carrier of the first gearset ("first" means closer to the input shaft) is in synchrony with the second gearset's ring. Owing to these linkages, only two bands and two clutches are needed to command the gearsets.

In the first gear, the first gearset actuates on the second gearset and output shaft; the second gearset reacts and makes the sun turn in reverse, causing the first gearset to increase the reduction ratio.
In first gear, the input is locked to the first ring. The first carrier is locked to the output and second ring. The second carrier is locked so its ring motion causes the common sun to spin retrograde. The retrograde spin reduces the first carriers reaction to its ring motion thereby doubling the reduction of the first set and output.

Command of second gear is simpler, the second carrier is released and the sun drive is braked. Thus input is locked to the first ring, and output is locked to the first carrier.
 
The third gear is always direct drive (1:1), by feeding input to both the sun drive and the first ring, both carriers are effectively locked, so input directly drives the output.

Gear changing

One problem of changing from first to second gear is that two bands must actuate in synchrony: the planet carrier of the second gearset must release at the same time as the sun band is actuated. Sprag clutches mitigate roughness when a shift requires a combination of bands to be released or actuated.

GM's Turbo Hydra-Matic 350 and 400 transmissions utilized overrunning clutches in both the low and intermediate gears, allowing for fully progressive shifting with no "overlap". Gear changing patterns in some Simpson gearboxes, including modern 4-speed units, avoid first gear as much as they can, going up to 2nd as soon as possible, and avoiding reducing to 1st unless absolutely necessary (very slow speed plus floored throttle).

Modern gearsets
In the 1990s and 2000s, the Simpson gearset went out of fashion and was replaced by more complex transmissions. A Ravigneaux planetary gearset was combined with a simple planetary gearset to form a Lepelletier gearset, that offers six useful forward gears.

Even the latest 4-speed transmissions are not Simpson; they have only two planetary sets, while a Simpson transmission needs three planetary sets to get four speeds, the third planetary being an integrated overdrive.

Nevertheless, it is still possible to find new automatic transmissions based on the Simpson gearset. Such transmissions are three- or four-speed, and are often electronically controlled versions of older projects. They are kept in production because they are cheap, reliable, well-known and good enough for the target application.

References 

Automotive transmission technologies
Gears
Epicyclical gearing